is the first album of the Morning Musume subgroup Minimoni. It was released on June 26, 2002 and sold 187,470 copies.

Track listing
All songs are written and composed by Tsunku, with the exception of "Aiin Taishō", which was written by Hiroyuki Tomonaga and composed by Akihiko Takashima.

Members at the time of single

References

External links
 Minimoni Song Daihyakka Ikkan entry on the Hello! Project official website

Minimoni albums
2002 albums